This is a list of notable settlements in the Rhodope regional unit, Greece:

 Aigeiros
 Amaxades
 Aratos
 Arisvi
 Arriana
 Fillyra
 Gratini
 Iasmos 
 Imeros Rodopis
 Kalchas, Rhodope
 Kechros
 Kizari
 Komotini 
 Maroneia
 Neo Sidirochori
 Organi 
 Sapes
 Sostis

By municipality

See also
List of municipalities and communities in Greece (1997–2010)
List of municipalities of Greece (2011)

Rhodope